Leonardo DRS, formerly DRS Technologies, Inc., is a US-based defense contractor. Previously traded on the NYSE, the company was purchased by the Italian firm Finmeccanica (now Leonardo S.p.A.) in October 2008.

History
Diagnostic/Retrieval Systems, Inc (DRS) was founded in 1968 by Leonard Newman (whose son, Mark Newman, was the CEO until January 2012) and David Gross, two engineers working for Loral Corporation. The two were working on signal processing techniques for anti-submarine warfare. When Loral chose to pursue other technology, Newman and Gross founded DRS to continue their research, which ultimately led to development of the AN/SQR-17 passive submarine detection system, a product still used today.

DRS went public in 1981 and acquired its first company in 1984. By 1994, DRS set a goal to become a mid-tier defense contractor, defined by $500 million in sales – notwithstanding that DRS at the time had only $58M in sales. Six years later, at the turn of the century, DRS reached the $391 million sales level, and in 2004 surpassed the $1 billion sales mark.

DRS was acquired by the Italian conglomerate Finmeccanica S.p.A. (now Leonardo S.p.A.) in 2008. In 2012, former United States Deputy Secretary of Defense, William J. Lynn III was appointed CEO of Finmeccanica North America DRS, replacing Mark Newman, who held the position since 1994.

In June of 2022, Israel-based RADA Electronic Industries and Leonardo DRS announced an all-stock merger.

Products

Advanced Trainer
 Leonardo DRS T-100 Integrated Training System
 M1000 Trailer, part of the Heavy Equipment Transport System

Drone
 DRS RQ-15 Neptune
 DRS Sentry HP

See also
Top 100 US Federal Contractors
War economy

References

External links
 DRS Technologies, Inc. Corporate Web Site
 Washington Technology's Top 100 Federal Prime Contractors
 Best for Vets 2012: Employers

Technology companies established in 1968
Defense companies of the United States
Companies based in Morris County, New Jersey
Parsippany-Troy Hills, New Jersey
Leonardo S.p.A.
2008 mergers and acquisitions
American subsidiaries of foreign companies